Château-Thierry – Belleau Aerodrome  is an aerodrome or airport located  northwest of Château-Thierry and southeast of Belleau, both communes in the Aisne department of the Picardy (Picardie) region in France.

Facilities

The airport is not controlled. The communications frequency is 120.375 MHz, which is shared with the nearby Soissons-Courmelles Aerodrome.

References

External links
  Aéroclub de CHATEAU THIERRY
 
 

Airports in Hauts-de-France
Buildings and structures in Aisne